Andy Roddick was the defending champion, but lost in the quarterfinals to Viktor Troicki.

Juan Martín del Potro won in the final 6–3, 6–3, against Viktor Troicki.

Seeds

Draw

Finals

Top half

Bottom half

External links
Draw
Qualifying draw

Singles